Earias flavida is a moth of the family Nolidae. It was described by Cajetan Felder in 1861. It is found from the Indo-Australian tropics of India, Sri Lanka, Sumatra and Java to Samoa and Tonga.

Description
The wingspan is about 15 mm. Head, thorax and forewings are bright yellow. There are very indistinct antemedial and postmedial greenish lines. The outer margin is tinged with green. A brown annulus on the discocellulars is present. Hindwings are semi-diaphanous white with apex suffused with yellow.

Ecology
The larvae feed on the buds and young fruits of Grewia species. They are light yellowish brown to smoky black with a marbled, grey or light brown dorsal band. Pupation takes place in a papery brown cocoon.

References

 "Earias flavida Felder, 1861". Insecta.pro. Retrieved 14 January 2019.

Moths described in 1861
Nolidae